"Fester Skank" is a single by the English grime rapper Lethal Bizzle, featuring the Dutch electronic producer Diztortion. It was released on 12 April 2015 for digital download in the United Kingdom and was his first single to be released after signing to Virgin EMI Records. The song peaked at number 11 on the UK Singles Chart.

A remix is available featuring Stormzy, Chip, Fuse ODG and Wretch 32.

The girl group Little Mix included this song in a medley in the British arena gigs of their worldwide Get Weird Tour which sold 300,000 tickets. Lethal Bizzle joined Little Mix in the performance at the Wembley Arena, but the song was not included in Little Mix's medley in non-UK gigs. Lethal Bizzle and Little Mix later duetted the song at the V Festival on 21 August 2016.

Track listings

Charts

Certifications

Release history

References

2015 songs
2015 singles
Lethal Bizzle songs
Songs written by Lethal Bizzle
Songs written by Diztortion
Universal Records singles
Virgin EMI Records singles